Alan Dornan (born 30 August 1962) is a retired Northern Irish footballer and manager.

Playing career
He played over 1000 games, for Ards, Linfield and Crusaders in a playing career which spanned from 1981 to 2003.

Managerial career
He also had a short but unsuccessful spell in charge of the latter. He was the first ever Crusaders manager to be sacked.

Honours
Linfield
Irish League (5): 1985-86, 1986-87, 1988-89, 1992-93, 1993-94
Irish Cup (2): 1993-94, 1994–95
Irish League Cup (3): 1986-87, 1991–92, 1993–94
County Antrim Shield (1): 1994-95
Charity Shield (2): 1993-94 (shared), 1994–95
Gold Cup (3): 1987-88, 1988–89, 1989–90
Ulster Cup (1): 1992-93
Floodlit Cup (1): 1993-94

Crusaders
Irish League (1): 1996-97
Irish League Cup (1): 1996-97

Glenavon
Mid-Ulster Cup (1): 1998-99

References

External links
Manager of Crusaders
Crusaders F.C. website

Ards F.C. players
Crusaders F.C. players
Glenavon F.C. players
Linfield F.C. players
Crusaders F.C. managers
Living people
Association footballers from Northern Ireland
1962 births
Association football defenders
Football managers from Northern Ireland